Francis Sullivan may refer to:

Francis Sullivan (ice hockey) (1917–2007), Canadian ice hockey player
Francis A. Sullivan (1922-2019), American Jesuit priest and theologian
Francis Conroy Sullivan (1882–1929), Canadian architect
Francis Henry Sullivan (1916–1942), member of the U.S. Navy; one of the five American Sullivan brothers killed in World War II
Francis L. Sullivan (1903–1956), English actor
Francis D. Sullivan, former member of the Ohio Senate
Francis J. Sullivan (born 1956), CEO of the Catholic Church in Australia's Truth, Justice and Healing Council
Sir Francis Sullivan, 6th Baronet (1834–1906), Royal Navy admiral
Francis Stoughton Sullivan (1715–1766), Irish lawyer and professor of oratory
Francis William Sullivan, author

See also
Frank Sullivan (disambiguation)